Ballabhgarh railway station is a railway station is in Ballabhgarh, Faridabad district, Haryana. Its code is BVH. It is fall under Northern Railway zone's Delhi railway division. It serves Faridabad and surrounding areas. The station consists of 5 platforms.

Suburban railway
Ballabhgarh is part of the Delhi Suburban Railway and is served by EMU trains.

Electrification
The Faridabad–Mathura–Agra section was electrified in 1982–85.

References

Railway stations in Faridabad district